Dora Union is a union parishad of Kotchandpur Upazila,  in Jhenaidah District, Khulna Division of Bangladesh. There are 18 villages and 16 mouzas in the union.

References

External links
 

Unions of Khulna Division
Unions of Kotchandpur Upazila
Unions of Jhenaidah District